The Joe Bill Dryden Semper Viper Award is an award granted by Lockheed Martin to a pilot that has demonstrated exceptional abilities.

Joe Bill Dryden was a famous pilot in the United States Air Force and a test-pilot for General Dynamics. He crashed during an F-16 Fighting Falcon test flight.

Future Belgian Astronaut Frank de Winne was the first non-American pilot to receive this award in 1997. He managed to land his F-16 safely despite a failure his engine and main flight instruments. He opted not to use his ejection seat because there was a strong chance that his aircraft would crash in the densely populated 
surroundings of Leeuwarden.

References 
 The award's website
 Website of the Belgian luchtcomponent regarding Frank de Winne's issue

Military awards and decorations of the United States